The South African Railways Class 34-000 of 1971 is a diesel-electric locomotive.

Between July 1971 and March 1973, the South African Railways placed 125 Class 34-000 General Electric type U26C diesel-electric locomotives in service.

Manufacturer
The Class 34-000 type GE U26C diesel-electric locomotive of the South African Railways (SAR) was designed by General Electric (GE). The first three locomotives were built by GE and imported, numbered in the range from 34-001 to 34-003, while the remainder were built by the South African General Electric-Dorman Long Locomotive Group (SA GE-DL, later Dorbyl) and numbered in the range from 34-004 to 34-125. The 125 locomotives entered service between July 1971 and March 1973.

The same U26C locomotive type is also in use on other railways around the world. One of them is the New Zealand Railways, where it is known as their DX class. Other users are Kenya Railways who for some years also leased South African Class 34 U26C locomotives, and América Latina Logística (ALL) in Brazil.

Class 34 series

GE and GM-EMD designs
Both manufacturers also produced locomotives for the South African Classes 33, 35 and 36.

Distinguishing features
As built, the GE Classes ,  and  locomotives were visually indistinguishable from each other. The Class  locomotives could be visually distinguished from the other series by the air conditioning units mounted on their cab roofs and initially when it was still a feature unique to them, by their running board mounted handrails. At some stage during the mid-1980s, all Class 34-000, 34-400 and 34-500 locomotives had saddle filters installed across the long hood, mounted just to the rear of the screens behind the cab on the sides. Since then, Class 34-900 locomotives could be distinguished from the older models by the absence of the saddle filter.

Modifications

Fuel capacity
As built, the Class 34-000 has a  fuel tank and interlinked bogies, while the Class  was delivered new to Iscor with a  fuel tank to cope with the lack of en route refuelling points on the Sishen-Saldanha iron ore line. To facilitate the larger fuel tank, the inter-bogie linkage found on all other models had to be omitted on the Class .

To be usable on the iron ore line, Class 34-000 locomotives which ended up working there were modified to a similar fuel capacity. The inter-bogie linkage was removed and the fuel tank was enlarged by changing it from saddle-shaped to rectangular box-shaped. To maintain its lateral balance, a slab of metal was attached to each bogie in place of the removed linkage. In the second picture, the weld lines on the end of the enlarged fuel tank as well as the metal slab at the end of the bogie are visible.

Running board mounted handrails
Class 34-000 locomotives that were allocated to the Sishen-Saldanha Orex line were often modified by having removable running board-mounted handrails installed. All pre-2000 South African diesel-electric locomotives had their side handrails mounted along the upper edges of their long hoods. The ex Iscor Class 34-500s, however, came equipped with additional removable running board-mounted handrails. Since these handrails are slide-fit into brackets which are welded onto the running board, they are easily removed.

Since c. 2009, other mainline diesel-electric locomotive types also emerged from the Koedoespoort Transwerk shops with running board mounted handrails after major overhauls.

Electronic control system
Beginning in 2010, some Class 34-000 locomotives were equipped with electronic fuel injection and GE "Bright Star" control systems. On some of the first locomotives which were so modified, evidence of the modification is a raised middle portion of the long hood.

Service

GE Class 34-000s work on most mainlines and some branch lines in the central, western, southern  and southeastern parts of the country. Some eventually joined the Class 34-500 on the  Sishen–Saldanha Orex line to haul export ore from the open cast iron mines at Sishen near Kathu in the Northern Cape to the harbour at Saldanha in the Western Cape, until they gradually began to be replaced by new Class 43-000 locomotives in 2012.

On the Orex line, GE Class 34 series diesel-electric locomotives ran consisted to Class 9E or Class 15E electric locomotives to haul the 342-wagon iron ore trains. Each wagon has a 100-ton capacity and the trains are at least  in length, powered by mixed consists of Class 9E and Class 15E electric, GE U26C Class 34-000, 34-500 and 34-900 and from 2012, GE C30ACi Class 43-000 diesel-electric locomotives. In South Africa, mixed electric and diesel-electric consists are unique to the iron ore line.

Works numbers
The Class 34-000 builder's works numbers are listed in the table.

Liveries
With five exceptions, the Class 34-000 were all delivered in the SAR Gulf Red livery with signal red buffer beams, yellow side stripes on the long hood sides and a yellow V on each end. The five exceptions, numbers 34-055 to 34-059, were delivered in blue with a yellow V on the ends and yellow buffer beams for use on the Blue Train between Kimberley and Beaufort West. They were all eventually repainted in Spoornet’s orange livery after they were replaced in Blue Train service by seven Class 34-900 locomotives, numbers 34-924 to 34-930.

In the 1990s many of the Class 34-000 units began to be repainted in the Spoornet orange livery with a yellow and blue chevron pattern on the buffer beams. Several later received the Spoornet maroon livery. In the late 1990s many were repainted in the Spoornet blue livery with outline numbers on the long hood sides. After 2008 in the Transnet Freight Rail (TFR) and Passenger Rail Agency of South Africa (PRASA) era, many were repainted in the TFR red, green and yellow livery and at least four were repainted in the PRASA purple livery.

Illustration

References

External links

3350
C-C locomotives
Co′Co′ locomotives
Co+Co locomotives
General Electric locomotives
Dorbyl locomotives
Cape gauge railway locomotives
Railway locomotives introduced in 1971
1971 in South Africa